Obeza is a genus of chalcid wasps in the family Eucharitidae. There are about eight described species in Obeza.

Species
These eight species belong to the genus Obeza:
 Obeza floridana (Ashmead, 1888) c g b
 Obeza grenadensis (Howard, 1897) c g
 Obeza maculata (Westwood, 1874) c g
 Obeza meridionalis (Kirby, 1889) c g
 Obeza nigriceps (Ashmead, 1904) c g
 Obeza nigromaculata (Cameron, 1884) c g
 Obeza semifumipennis (Girault, 1911) c g
 Obeza septentrionalis (Brues, 1907) c g
Data sources: i = ITIS, c = Catalogue of Life, g = GBIF, b = Bugguide.net

References

Further reading

External links

 

Parasitic wasps
Chalcidoidea